Istanbul Unveiled is a 61-minute travel documentary film produced in English about Istanbul and Turkish culture in 2013.

Scriptwriter Şerif Yenen co-produced the film with Saadet Özen and co-directed it with Levent Ayasli. Hosted by American actress Jessica Berkmen, the footage took more than 2 years. The musical pieces composed by Mercan Dede, Baba Zula and Burhan Öçal have been used.

The documentary contains interviews with many people including Asena, Demet Sabancı, Dilek Hanif, Nadir Güllü, Nick Merdenyan, Tülin Şahin and Vedat Başaran.

Awards and nominations
 Best Feature Documentary, World Music & Independent Film Festival, Washington D.C.
 Best Documentary, International Tourism Film Festival “On the East Coast of Europe”, Bulgaria
 Best Documentary, FilmAT - Film, Art & Tourism Festival, Poland
 Best Promotional Travel Movie, Tourism International Film Festival, Romania
 Special Award, Zagreb Tourfilm Festival, Croatia
 Nominee for the Grand Prix 2014, CIFFT, Austria
 Second Best Documentary, Sunset International Film Festival, Los Angeles

Cast
 Jayda Berkmen as herself-Host

rest of cast listed alphabetically
 Asena as herself
 Vedat Başaran as himself
 Nadir Güllü as himself
 Dilek Hanif as herself
 Nick Merdenyan as himself
 Demet Sabancı as herself
 Tülin Şahin as herself

External links

Notes

2013 films
Turkish documentary films
2013 documentary films
2010s English-language films